Milton Braga (born 16 February 1954) is a Brazilian diver. He competed at the 1976 Summer Olympics and the 1980 Summer Olympics.

References

External links
 

1954 births
Living people
Brazilian male divers
Olympic divers of Brazil
Divers at the 1976 Summer Olympics
Divers at the 1980 Summer Olympics
Divers from Rio de Janeiro (city)
Sportspeople from Rio de Janeiro (city)
20th-century Brazilian people